Sulcia can refer to two different genera of organisms:

 Sulcia, a genus of spiders in the family Leptonetidae
 "Candidatus Sulcia (bacteria)", a monotypic genus including "Ca. Sulcia muelleri"